The Thirumalida Swayambhoo Shiva Temple is a Hindu Temple located in Mallappally in Pathanamthitta district in the southern part of Kerala, India.
It is the only swayambhoo Siva temple facing west on the banks of a river. Thousands of devotees gather here on Mahasivarathrii day. Mallappally kavadiyattam on the sandy shore of river manimala is very famous.

Hindu temples in Pathanamthitta district
Shiva temples in Kerala